The Bem Sex-Role Inventory (BSRI)  is a measure of masculinity and femininity, and is used to research gender roles. It assesses how people identify themselves psychologically. Sandra Bem's goal of the BSRI was to examine psychological androgyny and provide empirical evidence to show the advantage of a shared masculine and feminine personality versus a sex-typed categorization. The test is formatted with 60 different personality traits which participants rate themselves based on a 7-point Likert scale. Traits are evenly dispersed, 20 masculine, 20 feminine, and 20 filler traits thought to be gender neutral. All traits in the BSRI are positively valued personality aspects. Numerous past studies have found that gender categorizations are correlated with many stereotypical gendered behaviors.

History
"In the field of psychology, much research is conducted involving individuals' perceptions of gender roles, and behavioral as well as attitudinal correlates.  Gender roles may be defined as "expectations about what is appropriate behavior for each sex".  One can also add to this definition the expectations which are held about appropriate personality characteristics." The Bem Sex-Role Inventory was created by Sandra Bem in an effort to measure androgyny.  It was published in 1974. Stereotypical masculine and feminine traits were found by surveying 100 Stanford undergraduate students on which traits they found to be socially desirable for each sex. The original list of 200 traits was narrowed down to the 40 masculine and feminine traits that appear on the present test. Normative data was found from a 1973 sample for 444 males and 279 females and a 1978 sample of 340 females and 476 males all also from Stanford University undergraduates.

Scoring and interpretation
Participants are asked to rate themselves on each trait using a Likert scale. One indicates never or almost never true, while a seven would indicate always or almost always true. Originally androgyny was calculated by finding the t-ratio difference between masculine and feminine scores; however, in 1981 Bem advises users to utilize a split median technique for more accurate scoring.

The Bem Sex-Role Inventory offers four different possible resulting categorizations: masculine, feminine, androgynous and undifferentiated. Previously, an androgynous score was thought to be the result of equal masculine and feminine traits, while a sex-typed masculine or feminine score is the result of more traits belonging in one or the other category. The fourth type of score, undifferentiated, was seen as the result of extremely low masculine and feminine traits.

However, after the change in scoring technique, androgynous is the result of scoring above the median in both masculine and feminine categories. Sex-typed scores, masculine and feminine, are the result of scoring above the median in one gender and below the median in the other. An undifferentiated score is now a result of scoring below the median in both masculine and feminine categories. In other words, since scores are based on normative data, an androgynous classification occurs when a subject scores above 50% of the comparison group in both masculine and feminine categories, while a sex-typed classification is the result of scoring above half the comparison group in only one gender category.

Reliability and validity
The BSRI is very empirically sound. Bem reports coefficient alphas of .78 for femininity scales and .87 for the masculinity scale. BSRI, also has demonstrated high test-retest reliability.

However, since this is a self-report inventory, how reliable the assessment is depends on how accurately participants rate themselves. An androgynous score is the result of extremely masculine and feminine scores and an undifferentiated score is the result of extremely low masculine and feminine scores. It has been theorized that perhaps tendencies to rate oneself extremely low and extremely high on traits can affect a subjects' resulting gender placement.

The degree of reliability of each scoring technique is up for debate. When comparing the old t ratio scoring to the newly endorsed median split technique, 42.3% of participants had a different resulting categorization. Since the median split method bases scores more heavily on the normative data of that population, a participant can be categorized differently based on the population of subjects they take the test with. For example, results may differ if the test was administered to a group of marines versus students at a private girls highschool. This challenges the test's between sample reliability. As stated by Elazae Pedhazur in a clip from his critique, "Bem concludes her discussion by stating, 'Finally, we urge investigators to further analyze their data without categorizing individual subjects in any way, i.e., through the use of multiple regression technique.' While endorsing what appears to be a suggestion to conduct studies within the framework of trait-treatment interactions, one cannot help wondering: Where has androgyny gone?"

Bem Sex-Role Inventory (short form)
The short form of the BSRI consists of 30 items. It has a strong .90 correlation with the original BSRI. This short form of the test allows for increased internal consistency. Bem reports similar masculinity coefficient alphas and higher femininity coefficient alphas with this form. The short form discards the traits "feminine", "masculine", and "athletic" from the self-report scales. Specifically, the short form removed some feminine traits that could be seen as less socially desirable such as "gullible" and "childlike". Masculine categories depict "assertive-dominance" and "instrumentality", while feminine categories depict "nurtureness-interpersonal warmth" and "expressiveness".

See also
Gender expression
Sex and gender distinction

Notes and references 

Gender roles
Role status
Androgyny
Personality tests measuring masculinity-femininity